Subir Dey (born 27 September 1959) is an Indian former cricketer. He played six first-class matches for Bengal between 1986 and 1996.

See also
 List of Bengal cricketers

References

External links
 

1959 births
Living people
Indian cricketers
Bengal cricketers
Cricketers from Kolkata